Jonas Castrique (born 13 January 1997) is a Belgian professional racing cyclist, who currently rides for UCI ProTeam . In October 2020, he rode in the 2020 Gent–Wevelgem race in Belgium.

Major results
2016
 7th Overall Carpathian Couriers Race
2017
 9th Overall Olympia's Tour
2019
 6th Grand Prix Criquielion
 8th Kattekoers

References

External links
 

1997 births
Living people
Belgian male cyclists
People from Roeselare
Cyclists from West Flanders
21st-century Belgian people